"21" is the debut single by The Paddingtons, released on 11 October 2004, which was later re-recorded for the album First Comes First. It is this song that convinced Alan McGee to sign them and on the basis of this songs popularity got them an album deal.

Released over two formats it never quite managed to reach the UK Top 40 charting at 46 it featured 2 previously unreleased song, the details of which are listed below:

CD - MC5093SCD
 "21"
 "Some Old Girl"
 "She's Got It"

7" - MC5093S
A1. "21"
B1. "Some Old Girl"

Trivia
 Although "Some Old Girl" was unreleased at the time, it to was later re-recorded for the album.
 The single ran on a limited press and is now considered a much sought after item on eBay.

References

2004 singles
The Paddingtons songs
2004 songs